Cerdas Barus (born 1 January 1961 in Karo, North Sumatra) is an Indonesian deaf chess grandmaster (2004).

He has won the Indonesian Chess Championship three times. In 2002, he came second at Surabaya. In 2011 he won the Telin Chess International Tournament in Jakarta. In December 2015 he participated at the Penang Open tournament in Malaysia with 119 players; he became shared 11th with 6 points out of 9 rounds.

He played for Indonesia in the Chess Olympiads of 1984, 1988, 1990, 1994, 1996, 2000 and 2002 (individual gold medal at third board).

References

External links

1961 births
Living people
Chess grandmasters
Chess Olympiad competitors
Indonesian chess players
People of Batak descent
20th-century Indonesian people
21st-century Indonesian people